Tivoli Stadium could refer to one of the following:

 New Tivoli in Aachen
 Old Tivoli in Aachen
 Tivoli Stadion Tirol (formerly named Tivoli-Neu) in Innsbruck
 Tivoli in La Louvière